Richard Clapp may refer to:
Richard Clapp (epidemiologist)
Stubby Clapp (Richard Keith Clapp; born 1973), Canadian baseball player and coach